Stephen William Kuffler  (August 24 Táp, Austria-Hungary, 1913 – October 11, 1980) was a pre-eminent Hungarian-American neurophysiologist. He is often referred to as the "Father of Modern Neuroscience". Kuffler, alongside noted Nobel Laureates Sir John Eccles and Sir Bernard Katz gave research lectures at the University of Sydney, strongly influencing its intellectual environment while working at Sydney Hospital. He founded the Harvard Neurobiology department in 1966, and made numerous seminal contributions to our understanding of vision, neural coding, and the neural implementation of behavior. He is known for his research on neuromuscular junctions in frogs, presynaptic inhibition, and the neurotransmitter GABA. In 1972, he was awarded the Louisa Gross Horwitz Prize from Columbia University.

Honors and awards

Kuffler was widely recognized as a truly original and creative neuroscientist. In addition to numerous prizes, honorary degrees, and special lectureships from countries over the world, Steve was elected to the American Academy of Arts and Sciences in 1960, National Academy of Sciences in 1964, the Royal Society as Foreign Member in 1971, and the American Philosophical Society in 1978. In 1964 he was named the Robert Winthrop professor of neurophysiology and neuropharmacology. From 1966 to 1974 he was the Robert Winthrop professor of neurobiology, and in 1974 he became John Franklin Enders university professor.

A detailed, affectionate, and authoritative account of Stephen Kuffler's life and work has been provided by Sir Bernard Katz (Biographical Memoirs of Fellows of the Royal Society, vol. 28, pp. 225–59, 1982) and in a book entitled Steve, Remembrances of Stephen W. Kuffler, compiled and introduced by U. J. McMahan (Sunderland, Mass.: Sinauer Associates, 1990).  An account of Kuffler's work is given by Eric R. Kandel, In Search of Memory: The Emergence of a New Science of Mind (New York: Norton, 2006), stating: 'I don't think anyone on the American scene since then has been as influential or as beloved as Steve Kuffler.'

See also
 Seymour Benzer
 David Hubel
 Eric R. Kandel
 David Rioch
 Gunther Stent
 Torsten Wiesel
 Louisa Gross Horwitz Prize

References

External links
 Biography by The Lancet
 Biographical article in the Journal of Neurology, 2016.
 Stephen W. Kuffler's biographical memoir at the National Academy of Sciences.
 The Official Site of Louisa Gross Horwitz Prize
National Academy of Sciences Biographical Memoir

1913 births
1980 deaths
Harvard University faculty
American physiologists
American neurologists
Hungarian neurologists
Hungarian physiologists
Hungarian scientists
Foreign Members of the Royal Society
Members of the United States National Academy of Sciences
Neurophysiologists
Hungarian emigrants to the United States
Members of the American Philosophical Society